Kibblewhite is a surname. Notable people with the surname include:

 Ebeneezer J. Kibblewhite (fl. 1860–1910), English editor
 Ethel Kibblewhite (1873–1947), host of an artistic and literary salon in London
 Paul Kibblewhite (1941–2015), New Zealand scientist
 Michael Kibblewhite, English choral conductor
also
 Graham Kibble-White British writer and popular culture critic